Christopher P. Weggeman (born 1965) is a retired lieutenant general in the United States Air Force who last served as deputy commander of Air Combat Command from 2018 to 2021. He was commissioned through the ROTC program at Purdue University in 1987.

Awards and decorations

Effective dates of promotions

References

1965 births
United States Air Force personnel of the Gulf War
United States Air Force personnel of the Iraq War
Living people
Purdue University alumni
Recipients of the Air Force Distinguished Service Medal
Recipients of the Defense Superior Service Medal
Recipients of the Distinguished Flying Cross (United States)
Recipients of the Legion of Merit
Air War College alumni
United States Army Command and General Staff College alumni